Paul Gildner (1 February 1914 – 24 February 1943) was a German Luftwaffe military aviator during World War II, a night fighter ace credited with 44 aerial victories, including two by day, claimed in approximately 160 combat missions making him one of the more successful night fighter pilots in the Luftwaffe. All of his victories were claimed over the Western Front in Defense of the Reich missions against the Royal Air Force's (RAF) Bomber Command.

Born in Nimptsch, Gildner grew up in the Weimar Republic and Nazi Germany. Following graduation from school and the compulsory Reichsarbeitsdienst (Reich Labour Service), he joined the military service in 1933, at first with an infantry regiment before he transferred to the Luftwaffe in 1935. Trained as a pilot, Gildner served with Zerstörergeschwader 1 (ZG 1—1st Destroyer Wing), flying a Messerschmitt Bf 110 heavy fighter, at the start of World War II. He claimed his first aerial victory during the Battle of France. In June 1940, the Luftwaffe created its first night fighter wing, Nachtjagdgeschwader 1 (NJG 1—1st Night Fighter Wing), and Gildner transferred to this unit. There he claimed his first nocturnal aerial victory on the night of 2/3 September 1940. On 9 July 1941, he was awarded the Knight's Cross of the Iron Cross after his 16th aerial victory, 14 of which claimed at night. At the end of 1941, Gildner was the second leading night fighter pilot of the Luftwaffe.

Gildner was appointed squadron leader of 1. Staffel (1st squadron) of NJG 1 in February 1943. After crash landing his Me-110 following engine failure, Gildner couldn't escape from his burning plane and perished in the flames. Posthumously, Gildner was awarded the Knight's Cross of the Iron Cross with Oak Leaves on 26 February 1943.

Early life and career
Gildner was born on 1 February 1914 in Nimptsch, present-day Niemcza in the Lower Silesian Voivodeship of south-western Poland, at the time in the Province of Silesia in the German Empire. Following graduation from school and a vocational education in metalworking, he completed his compulsory labour service (Reichsarbeitsdienst).

In early 1933, Gildner joined the military service of the Reichswehr as a cadet with Infanterie-Regiment 7 in Schweidnitz, an infantry regiment of the 3rd Division. In 1935, he was transferred to the newly emerging Luftwaffe of the Wehrmacht. In 1937, he began flight training, and was promoted to Unteroffizier (subordinate officer) on 1 September 1937. After he completed flight training, Gildner was posted to an aerial reconnaissance unit where he served as a pilot. In the fall of 1938, he was posted to the 6. Staffel (6th Squadron) of Jagdgeschwader 132 "Richthofen" (JG 132—132nd Fighter Wing), named after the World War I fighter ace Manfred von Richthofen. This squadron was subordinated to the II. Gruppe (2nd group) of JG 132. On 1 November 1938, II. Gruppe was detached from JG 132 and was reassigned as I. Gruppe of Zerstörergeschwader 141 (ZG 141—141st Destroyer Wing).  I./ZG 141 was based at Jüterbog-Damm and was equipped with the Messerschmitt Bf 109 D-1. On 1 May 1939, I./ZG 141 was renamed again and became the I. Gruppe of Zerstörergeschwader 1 (ZG 1—1st Destroyer Wing) and was the equipped with the Messerschmitt Bf 110 heavy fighter.

World War II
World War II in Europe had begun on Friday 1 September 1939 when German forces invaded Poland. Flying with I./ZG 1, Gildner participated in the invasion of Poland and the Norwegian Campaign. In February 1940, I./ZG 1 was placed under the command of Hauptmann (Captain) Wolfgang Falck. With the start of the Norwegian Campaign in April 1940, I./ZG 1 was moved to Aalborg airfield. There, the airfield came under night attacks by the Royal Air Force (RAF) Bomber Command, leading Falck to conduct his first experiments of nocturnal aerial combat.

During the Battle of France, Gildner claimed his first aerial victory on 10 May 1940 over a Bristol Blenheim bomber in the vicinity of Waalhaven. His second and last daytime aerial victory was claimed over a French Morane-Saulnier M.S.406 fighter on 5 June 1940.

Night fighter career

Following the 1939 aerial Battle of the Heligoland Bight, RAF attacks shifted to the cover of darkness, initiating the Defence of the Reich campaign. By mid-1940, Generalmajor (Brigadier General) Josef Kammhuber had established a night air defense system dubbed the Kammhuber Line. It consisted of a series of control sectors equipped with radars and searchlights and an associated night fighter. Each sector named a Himmelbett (canopy bed) would direct the night fighter into visual range with target bombers. In 1941, the Luftwaffe started equipping night fighters with airborne radar such as the Lichtenstein radar. This airborne radar did not come into general use until early 1942.

Following the Battle of France, Falck was tasked with the creation of the Luftwaffe's first night fighter wing, Nachtjagdgeschwader 1 (NJG 1—1st Night Fighter Wing). His former unit, I./ZG 1 formed the nucleus of I. Gruppe of NJG 1 which was placed under the command of Oberleutnant (First Lieutenant) Werner Streib. Now flying in the 3. Staffel of NJG 1, Gildner claimed his first aerial victory as a night fighter pilot on the night of 2/3 September 1940. The bomber, a Handley Page Hampden from the RAF No. 144 Squadron, was shot down near Sittard on its mission to bomb Ludwigshafen. The Hampden was identified as P4370, the pilot and another crewmember were taken prisoner of war and two further crewmembers were killed in action. On 18/19 September 1940, Gildner was credited with the destruction of two Armstrong Whitworth Whitley bombers. The first bomber was Whitley V P5008 from No. 58 Squadron was on a bombing mission to Hamm and crashed southeast of Groenlo. The second Whitley N1425 from No. 77 Squadron, on a mission to Soest, was shot down near Zieuwent. On 13 March 1941 Gildner accounted for Wellington Mark I C N2746 BU-M from 214 Squadron during a British attack on Hamburg. Flight Lieutenant Dickinson, DFC, and his crew with the exception of the tail gunner, perished. Gildner was photographed inspecting the wreck. Gildner achieved another success on 8 April, downing Sergeant Boyer's No. 51 Squadron RAF Whitley T4298 near Gröningen. Five of the crew including Boyer became prisoners.

On 9 July 1941, after his 16th aerial victory, 14 of which claimed at night, Gildner was awarded the Knight's Cross of the Iron Cross. Following Falck and Streib, he was the third soldier of the night fighter force and first noncommissioned officer to receive this distinction. The presentation of the Knight's Cross was made by Kammhuber, at the time commander of the 1. Nachtjagd-Division (1st Night Fighter Division).

Whitley V Z9306 KN-S, No. 77 Squadron RAF, formed part of the Düsseldorf raid during the night of 27/28 December 1941. Gildner shot it down over Friesland northwest of Leeuwarden near 'Zwarte Haan'. Four of the crew died from exposure after landing in the water. Their names, ranks and family are memorialised in the cemetery at the town Sint Jacobiparochie. 

With 21 nocturnal aerial victories claimed, Gildner was the second highest scoring night fighter pilot at the end of 1941. At the time, in first place was Streib with 22 nocturnal aerial victories claimed, and in third place with 20 nocturnal victories was Helmut Lent. On 18 May 1942, Gildner was awarded the German Cross in Gold and was promoted from Oberfeldwebel to Oberleutnant (first lieutenant), bypassing the rank of Leutnant (second lieutenant) in July. On 8/9 March 1942, Gildner shot down the Avro Manchester bomber R5779 from No. 83 Squadron on its mission to bomb Essen. The aircraft crashed near Smilde. Bristol Blenheim Z7307 from 114 Squadron was shot down by Gildner after taking off for an intruder sortie from West Raynham. Flight Sergeant W Popplestone and his crew died. Gildner likely accounted for a 106 Squadron Lancaster during the British attack on Wilhelmshaven on 8/9 July 1942. Lent, operating in the vicinity, accounted for a No. 75 Squadron RAF Wellington. Gildner's opponent was the only Lancaster lost in the raid out of 52 committed.

Squadron leader and death

On 3 February 1943, Gildner was on his way to Gilze en Rijen to take command of 3. Staffel of NJG 1 when his friend and commander of 1. Staffel of NJG 1, Oberleutnant Reinhold Knacke, was killed in action. In consequence of this event, Gildner was appointed Staffelkapitän (squadron leader) of 1. Staffel instead. On the night of 14/15 February 1943, Gildner claimed the destruction of a Vickers Wellington and Boeing B-17 Flying Fortress bomber. The Wellington was likely HE169 from No. 196 Squadron which crashed into the North Sea west of Schouwen, killing the crew. The B-17 appears to have been misidentified. In Bowman's account, the aircraft lost was Short Stirling I BF438 WP-D from No. 90 Squadron. The Stirling crashed west of Vlissingen with loss of the crew. According to Boiten, the Stirling may have been BK627 also from No. 90 Squadron.

Gildner claimed his last two aerial victories on the night of 19/20 February 1943. The claim over two Halifax bombers north of Vlieland may have been misidentified Avro Lancaster bombers from No. 156 Squadron RAF and No. 467 Squadron RAAF (Royal Australian Air Force). On 24 February 1943 flying near Fliegerhorst Gilze-Rijenin the Netherlands in his Messerschmitt Bf 110 G-4 (Werksnummer 4846—factory number), he attempted landing but had visibility issues due to fog and engine trouble. Following engine failure and fire, he ordered his radio operator Unteroffizier Heinz Huhn to bail out.  and crash landed his aircraft at a crossroads on the outskirts of the town Dongen, just near Fliegerhorst Gilze-Rijen at 22.45 hrs. Still alive but unable to escape the aircraft, Gildner  perished in the flames. Two eye witnesses wanted to help him but were kept at a distance by the exploding ammunition. Gildner was posthumously awarded the Knight's Cross of the Iron Cross with Oak Leaves on 26 February 1943. He was the 196th member of the German armed forces to be so honored. Gildner is buried at the German War Cemetery Ysselsteyn (Block M—Row 4—Grave 81) at Venray.

Summary of career

Aerial victory claims
Gildner was credited with 44—two daytime and 42 nighttime—aerial victories, claimed in about 160 combat missions. Foreman, Parry and Mathews, authors of Luftwaffe Night Fighter Claims 1939 – 1945, researched the German Federal Archives and found records for 41 nocturnal victory claims. Mathews and Foreman also published Luftwaffe Aces — Biographies and Victory Claims, listing Gildner with 43 claims, including two as a Zerstörer pilot, plus one further unconfirmed claim.

Awards
 Iron Cross (1939) 2nd and 1st Class
 German Cross in Gold on 18 May 1942 as Oberfeldwebel in the 5./Nachtjagdgeschwader 2
 Knight's Cross of the Iron Cross with Oak Leaves
 Knight's Cross on 9 July 1941 as Oberfeldwebel and pilot in the 3./Nachtjagdgeschwader 1
 196th Oak Leaves on 26 February 1943 as Oberleutnant and pilot in the 3./Nachtjagdgeschwader 1
 Mentioned four times in the Wehrmachtbericht (19 June 1941, 13 March 1942, 27 March 1942 and 23 April 1942)

Notes

References

Citations

Bibliography

 
 
 
 
 
 
 
 
 
 
 
 
 
 
 
 
 
 
 
 
 
 
 
 
 
 

1914 births
1943 deaths
Luftwaffe pilots
German World War II flying aces
Luftwaffe personnel killed in World War II
Recipients of the Gold German Cross
Recipients of the Knight's Cross of the Iron Cross with Oak Leaves
Aviators killed in aviation accidents or incidents in Belgium
Burials at Ysselsteyn German war cemetery
Reich Labour Service members